SolTrans, officially Solano County Transit, is  a Joint Powers Authority that provides public transportation service to the southern Solano County cities of Vallejo and Benicia. SolTrans was established in 2011 and is the result of a merger between Vallejo Transit and Benicia Breeze.

History 
The origins of SolTrans lead back to the early 20th century between two independent bus companies who served southern Solano County. These two companies were eventually acquired by the cities of either of Vallejo or Benicia, before consolidating to become Solano County Transit.

Vallejo Transit 
 The Vallejo Bus Company was founded by Hartley Lowell in 1919. In 1935, the Vallejo Bus Company began to change hands between a number of owners until 1949 when the City of Vallejo took control of it.
However, the Vallejo City Council opted to close it in 1956 due to financial restraints. In response, community leaders led by Senator Luther Gibson created the Vallejo Citizens Transit Corporation (VCTC) in hopes of continuing services in Vallejo. The city subsequently transferred the fleet of thirteen buses to VCTC, who branded it Vallejo Transit Lines on May 1.

Benicia Breeze 
The Benicia-Vallejo Stage Line was founded 1915 by Milo Passalacqua. The Stage Line offered a route between Mare Island and Benicia, serving Vallejo's train stations and ferry docks. In 1982, the City of Benicia began operating Benicia Dial-a-Ride, a local demand responsive transit service. Service was later expanded on July 1, 1986 to include a fixed route between Benicia and the Pleasant Hill BART station; this service was called the Benicia Bay Connection. The city also began subsidizing the Benicia-Vallejo Stage Line. On October 1, 1986, the Bay Connection and Stage Line were merged to become Benicia Transit. This new company was managed by Community Transit Services, who were eventually acquired by Laidlaw. During the 1990s, Benicia Transit adds a number of additional routes, such as the Southampton Express (1991–2001) and as a few school tripper routes. It also purchase five used Gillig Phantoms for their main route and begin serving the Martinez Amtrak station between 1994 and 1997, before dedicating a route to it in 2005.

MV Transportation was awarded a contract to operate Benicia Transit in 2000, who would acquire controlling interest in VCTC five years later, transforming it into an MV subsidiary. In 2001, the Benicia Flyer route serving the Southampton hills operated for one year, before being discontinued due to low ridership and replaced with the Benicia Rocket, a route serving the Benicia Industrial Park. By October 2005, all named routes were converted into numbers: the main Vallejo/Pleasant Hill eventually being Route 75; the Amtrak being Route 23, and school trippers being Routes 15 through 18.
2006 saw Benicia Transit being re-branded as Benicia Breeze, replacing its dial-a-ride service into deviated fixed-routes and reducing its school tripper routes to two. Route 75 was eventually retired in favor of Vallejo Transit Route 78, which extends the route to Walnut Creek.

Merger 
Discussions of merging the two transit agencies have occurred since 2005, however it wasn't until 2009 when a merger was seriously considered. In August, the Benicia city council reluctantly agreed with representatives of the Solano Transit Authority (STA) to study the possibility of creating a new transit agency with Vallejo Transit, citing the declining ridership and revenue caused by the Great Recession. On November 16, 2010, both cities agreed to enter into a joint powers authority agreement with the STA, calling the new transit agency Solano County Transit (or SolTrans for short). The name was selected out of fifteen others as it opens the possibility of other transit agencies in the county to join the agreement.

In 2013, National Express Transit replaced MV as its operations contractor, followed by Transdev in July 2021.

Services 
SolTrans provides local and express bus service to the Solano County cities of Vallejo, Benicia, and Fairfield. It also provides express bus service to the Contra Costa County communities of El Cerrito, Pleasant Hill, and Walnut Creek, providing regional connections to BART. SolTrans also provides ADA complementary paratransit within Vallejo and Benicia and General Public Dial a Ride within Benicia.

Ferry service from Vallejo to San Francisco, which was operated by Vallejo Transit, is now provided by San Francisco Bay Ferry, the public operating arm of the San Francisco Bay Area Water Emergency Transportation Authority [WETA].

Transit stations 
SolTrans operates three transportation hubs in Vallejo.

Vallejo Transit Center

Curtola Park & Ride 

The Curtola Park & Ride also known simply as Curtola is a bus station in South Vallejo, California, United States. The facility serves as a bus hub for transportation on local, commuter, and long-distance bus services.

In 2015 the bus station was upgraded for around $US10 million.

The station is served by SolTrans buses including local route 3 to the Glen Cove District. Line 78 provides intercity service to the Walnut Creek BART station while route 80 connects it to the El Cerrito del Norte BART station.

There is a casual carpool and vanpool area here. There is also an operations and maintenance facility for SolTrans here.

In 2013 some people expressed concern that parking fees may rise.

Sereno Transit Center 
The Sereno Transit Station is a bus station in North Vallejo.

Routes 
As of July 1, 2019, SolTrans operates sixteen bus routes: nine local routes and three supplemental school routes operate within the Vallejo/Benicia area, and three routes provide intercity service.

Fleet and livery 
SolTrans operates a mixed fleet of buses. When SolTrans was fully integrated in 2011, it introduced Gillig Low Floor hybrid buses for local bus service, while the intercity routes continue to use MCI D4500 buses. SolTrans continues to use a small number of Orion V buses previously used by Vallejo Transit. SolTrans also makes use of small cutaway buses from Starcraft Bus and ElDorado National for Paratransit and Dial-a-ride services. All buses are bicycle and wheelchair accessible.

In 2017, SolTrans introduced two new bus styles and accompanying updated paint scheme: An updated D4500 fueled by compressed natural gas (CNG); and the BYD K9M full-electric low-floor transit bus.

References

External links 

 
 City of Benicia: Bus / Transit Services

Bus transportation in California
Public transportation in Contra Costa County, California
Public transportation in San Francisco
Public transportation in Solano County, California
Intermodal transportation authorities in California
Transdev
2010 establishments in California